The North Plains Mall is an enclosed shopping mall in Clovis, New Mexico owned by Kohan Retail Investment Group. It is the only mall within its 95-mile radius and thus has drawn consumers across eastern New Mexico and west Texas. The mall is anchored by JCPenney with three vacant anchors last occupied by Dillard's, Sears, & Stage. At the time of the mall's 30th anniversary in 2015, it still had several original inline tenants. Price Development built the mall. On September 15, 2017, it was announced that Sears would be closing in December 2017. in May 2020, Dillard's permanently closed alongside 2 other locations at Crossroads Mall (Waterloo, Iowa) & Central Mall (Lawton, OK).  In July 2021, Kohan Retail Investment Group purchased the mall alongside 6 other malls from Brookfield Asset Management

References

External links

Shopping malls in New Mexico
Shopping malls established in 1985
1985 establishments in New Mexico
Kohan Retail Investment Group